Agness  Gidna is a Tanzanian paleontologist and  a former Senior Curator of Paleontology at the National Museum of Tanzania. She is currently working with Ngorongoro Conservation Area as a Senior Cultural Heritage Officer. She is the first Tanzanian woman to hold a doctorate in Physical Anthropology and she is the first Tanzanian female research director at Olduvai Gorge, where she has been a co-principal investigator of the Olduvai Palaeoanthropology and Paleoecology Project (TOPPP) since 2017.

Career 
She graduated from the University of Dar es Salaam, Complutense University of Madrid (Spain), and the University of Alcala (Spain). She is a founder of the largest Pastoral Neolithic site in sub-sahara Africa-(Luxmanda Site). She is a co-director of International research projects e.g. the Olduvai Gorge Project.

As Senior Curator of Paleontology at the National Museum of Tanzania, she has organized and curated two major exhibitions about human origin in Olduvai Gorge Museum, founded by Mary Leakey, and the National Museum of Tanzania. She gave tours to Monica Chakwera, First Lady of Malawi.

Selected works 

 Domínguez-Rodrigo, M., Baquedano, E., Pickering, T. R., Mabulla, A. Z., Bunn, H. T., Musiba, C., ... & Gidna, A. O. (2011). New associated hominin remains from BK (Upper Bed II, Olduvai Gorge, Tanzania).
Domínguez-Rodrigo, M., Baquedano, E., Díez Martín, F., Bunn, H. T., Pickering, T. R., Musiba, C., ... & Arriaza, M. D. C. (2012). La evolución conductual de los primeros Homo erectus (ergaster): estudio arqueológico y paleoecológico de los yacimientos antrópicos del lecho II de la Garganta de Olduvai: informe de la campaña de excavaciones en Olduvai. Año 2010.

Gidna, A., Yravedra, J., & Domínguez-Rodrigo, M. (January 1, 2013). A cautionary note on the use of captive carnivores to model wild predator behavior: A comparison of bone modification patterns on long bones by captive and wild lions. Journal of Archaeological Science, 40, 4, 1903–1910.
Gidna, A. O., & Domínguez-Rodrigo, M. (2013). A method for reconstructing human femoral length from fragmented shaft specimens. Homo, 64(1), 29–41.
Domínguez-Rodrigo, M., Bunn, H. T., Mabulla, A. Z., Baquedano, E., Uribelarrea del Val, D., Pérez-González, A., ... & Egeland, C. P. (2013). Did Homo erectus consume a Pelorovis herd at BK (Bed II, Olduvai Gorge)?.
Gidna, A. O. (2019). A comparative Study of Frontal Bone Morphology Among Pleistocene Hominin Fossils Group: A Study on Eyasi Hominin (EH6) Frontal Bone. Studies in the African Past, 12, 146–159.

Davies TW, Alemseged Z, Gidna A, et al. (2021) Accessory cusp expression at the enamel-dentine junction of hominin mandibular molars. Peerj. 2021 ;9:e11415. DOI: 10.7717/peerj.11415. PMID 34055484; PMCID: PMC8141287.

References 

Living people
Year of birth missing (living people)
Women paleontologists
Tanzanian curators
University of Dar es Salaam alumni
Place of birth missing (living people)
Complutense University of Madrid alumni
Tanzanian women scientists
University of Alcalá alumni